The Gunung Gading National Park is a national park in Lundu District, Kuching Division, Sarawak, Malaysia. The park is located roughly two hours drive from Kuching, and is a popular destination for seeing the Rafflesia flower in bloom. After 10 years as a conservation zone to protect the Rafflesia, the park opened to visitors in 1994.
The park also has a number of jungle trails to waterfalls or to the 965m summit of Gunung Gading.

One of the features of the park is great biodiversity.

Flora 
This is home to Rafflesia, the largest flower in the world that can reach a size of 1 meter in diameter.

See also
 List of national parks of Malaysia

External links
 Gunung Gading National Park in Kuching Sarawak
 Gunung Gading National Park - Sarawak Forestry Corporation

References 

Lundu District
National parks of Sarawak
Borneo lowland rain forests